The TowneBank OBX Park at First Flight Athletic Complex is a baseball venue in Kill Devil Hills, North Carolina at First Flight High School.  It is the home of the Outer Banks Daredevils of the Tidewater Summer League, a collegiate summer baseball league. The team, which was founded for the 1997 season, began playing at the field in the 2006 season.  Prior to this, the Daredevils had played at Coy Tillett Memorial Field in Manteo, North Carolina , In 2018 the OBX Daredevils temporally relocated to Virginia Beach while TowneBank OBX Park at First Flight Athletic Complex underwent a long overdue renovation. There temporary home venue is Lakewood Park in Norfolk, Virginia. The venue was closed 2018,2019 and is expected to be used in 2020. The field street address is 111 Veterans Drive, Kill Devils Hills, North Carolina.

The field's dimensions are 355 ft. down the foul lines, 368 ft. to the gaps, and 385 ft. to dead center field TowneBank OBX Park is home to not only the Daredevils but the First Flight High School Baseball Team
.

References

Minor league baseball venues
College baseball venues in the United States
Buildings and structures in Dare County, North Carolina
Baseball venues in North Carolina
High school baseball venues in the United States